Vindbjart Fotballklubb is a football club situated in Vennesla, Norway. They play in the 3. divisjon, the fourth tier in Norwegian football.

History
In 1995 Vindbjart won all their matches in the 3. divisjon. They won promotion to the 2. divisjon, but were relegated in 1997. They were promoted back for the 2008 season, but were relegated in 2017. They also have child teams with boys and girls from Hunsfos, Vennesla, Kvarstein and Moseidmoen.

Some former Vindbjart-players have later played in the Norwegian top division, including Mergim Hereqi, Tore Løvland and Avni Pepa.

Recent history
{|class="wikitable"
|-bgcolor="#efefef"
! Season
!
! Pos.
! Pl.
! W
! D
! L
! GS
! GA
! Pts
!Cup
!Notes
|-
|2008
|2. divisjon
|align=right |9
|align=right|26||align=right|9||align=right|4||align=right|13
|align=right|45||align=right|45||align=right|31
||Second round
|
|-
|2009
|2. divisjon
|align=right |6
|align=right|26||align=right|12||align=right|4||align=right|10
|align=right|47||align=right|47||align=right|40
||First round
|
|-
|2010
|2. divisjon
|align=right |7
|align=right|26||align=right|11||align=right|5||align=right|10
|align=right|47||align=right|52||align=right|38
||First round
|
|-
|2011
|2. divisjon
|align=right |3
|align=right|26||align=right|12||align=right|5||align=right|9
|align=right|51||align=right|54||align=right|41
||Second round
|
|-
|2012
|2. divisjon
|align=right |9
|align=right|26||align=right|9||align=right|8||align=right|9
|align=right|56||align=right|47||align=right|35
||First round
|
|-
|2013
|2. divisjon
|align=right |2
|align=right|26||align=right|15||align=right|4||align=right|7
|align=right|67||align=right|38||align=right|49
||Second round
|
|-
|2014
|2. divisjon
|align=right |2
|align=right|26||align=right|16||align=right|3||align=right|7
|align=right|71||align=right|44||align=right|51
||First round
|
|-
|2015
|2. divisjon
|align=right |6
|align=right|26||align=right|9||align=right|7||align=right|10
|align=right|61||align=right|56||align=right|34
||Third round
|
|-
|2016
|2. divisjon
|align=right |4
|align=right|26||align=right|14||align=right|2||align=right|10
|align=right|67||align=right|50||align=right|44
||Third round
|
|-
|2017
|2. divisjon
|align=right bgcolor="#FFCCCC"| 12
|align=right|26||align=right|6||align=right|4||align=right|16
|align=right|44||align=right|58||align=right|22
||First round
|Relegated
|-
|2018 
|3. divisjon
|align=right|3
|align=right|26||align=right|15||align=right|2||align=right|9
|align=right|58||align=right|48||align=right|47
||First round
|
|-
|2019 
|3. divisjon
|align=right|4
|align=right|26||align=right|12||align=right|7||align=right|7
|align=right|62||align=right|48||align=right|43
||First round
|
|-
|2020
|colspan="11"|Season cancelled
|-
|2021
|3. divisjon
|align=right |3
|align=right|13||align=right|8||align=right|1||align=right|4
|align=right|32||align=right|24||align=right|25
|First round
|
|-
|2022
|3. divisjon
|align=right |10
|align=right|26||align=right|7||align=right|8||align=right|11
|align=right|53||align=right|48||align=right|29
|First round
|
|}
Source:

References

External links

 Official site

Football clubs in Norway
Association football clubs established in 1896
Sport in Vest-Agder
Vennesla
1896 establishments in Norway